Marhi is a "shanty town of roadside restaurants" in Himachal Pradesh, India, located midway between Manali and Rohtang La on the Manali-Leh Highway. Buses traveling the highway often stop in Marhi so passengers can eat. The settlement is seasonal, with most businesses closing for the winter.

References

Cities and towns in Mandi district
Restaurants in India